Margaret Adebisi Sowunmi (née Jadesimi) (born September 24, 1939) is a Nigerian botanist and environmental archaeologist. She was Professor of Palynology and Environmental Archaeology at the University of Ibadan. She pioneered the study of environmental archaeology and palaeoethnobotany in Nigeria and is the founder and president of the Palynological Association of Nigeria.

Early life 
Sowunmi was born in Kano, Northern Nigeria on September 24, 1939. Her father was a pastor in the Church of Nigeria. She attended St Anne's School Ibadan for her secondary school education. She studied for a BSc in Special Botany in the Department of Botany, at University College Ibadan, graduating in 1962. She received a postgraduate scholarship in 1963 to undertake Phd research in palynology. In order to undertake research in palynology, Sowunmi travelled to Sweden to study with Gunnar Erdtman, who supervised her PhD. She earned her PhD in botany from the University of Ibadan in 1967.

Career 
In 1967 Sowunmi was appointed a postdoctoral research fellow in the Archaeology Unit at the Institute of African Studies, University of Ibadan. In 1971 she established the Nigerian University Palynology Laboratory. Sowunmi was appointed Professor of Palynology and Environmental Archaeology in 1982. Throughout her career Sowunmi held various visiting positions, in 1997 in the Department of African Archaeology, Uppsala University, and in 1998 at the Institute of Archaeology, University College London and the Departments of African Archaeology and African Archaeobotany, Johann Wolfgang Goethe-Universität. During the course of her career she supervised seven PhD students, and is noted for being an inspirational teacher. Sowunmi has worked on gender issues in archaeology in Nigeria, including modifying androcentric course titles.

Sowunmi was the founder and president of the Palynological Association of Nigeria, and president of the West African Archaeological Association. 

Sowunmi retired in 2004.

Research 
Sowunmi's research achievements include the first identifications of the age and paleoenvironment of the Gwandu Formation, the first descriptions of Eocene pollen of the Ogwashi-Asaba Formation, the first study of Late Quaternary vegetation and environmental history of Nigeria, and the first study of pollen from an archaeological site in Nigeria.

Awards and honours 
In 2003, Sowunmi received an honorary Doctor of Philosophy degree in the Humanities by Uppsala University to recognised her outstanding scholarship and research and teaching contributions in environmental archaeology and paleobotany.

Selected publications 
M.A. Sowunmi. 1972. Pollen morphology of the Palmae and its bearing on taxonomy. Review of Palaeobotany and Palynology
M.A. Sowunmi. 1973. Pollen grains of Nigerian plants: I. Woody species. Grana
R.J. du Chêne, M.S. Onyike & M.A. Sowunmi 1978. Some new Eocene pollen of the Ogwashi-Asaba Formation, south-eastern Nigeria. Revista Española de Micropaleontología 10(2), p. 285-322.
M.A Sowunmi. 1981. Aspects of Late Quaternary Vegetational Changes in West Africa. Journal of Biogeography 8: 457-474.
M.A. Sowunmi. 1985. The beginnings of agriculture in West Africa: botanical evidence. Current Anthropology
M.A. Sowunmi. 1995. Pollen grains of Nigerian plants: II. Woody Species. Grana 34: 120-141.
M.A. Sowunmi. 1998. Ecological archaeology in west Africa : the state of the discipline in ANDAH (B.W.) et al., Africa: the challenge of archaeology. Ibadan, Heinemann Educational Books, pp. 65–100
M.A. Sowunmi, 1998. Beyond academic archaeology in Africa: The human dimension. African Archaeological Review

References 

1939 births
Nigerian scientists
Nigerian women scientists
20th-century botanists
20th-century archaeologists
Women botanists
Nigerian archaeologists
Nigerian women archaeologists
Nigerian biologists
Nigerian women biologists
Archaeobotanists
Academic staff of Uppsala University
University of Ibadan alumni
Palynologists
Paleobotanists
People from Kano
Living people
Academics of the UCL Institute of Archaeology
St Anne's School, Ibadan alumni